Linamar Corporation (TSX:LNR) is a manufacturing company that specializes in producing solutions for various industries. The company is composed of two operating segments: the Industrial segment and the Mobility segment. The Industrial segment includes Skyjack, MacDon, and Salford, which manufacture aerial work platform equipment, agricultural harvesting equipment, and farm tillage and crop fertilizer applicator equipment, respectively. The Mobility segment is further divided into three regional groups: North America, Europe, and Asia Pacific. These groups focus on producing components and systems for both traditional and electrified vehicles, including powertrains, body and chassis, driveline, engine, and transmission systems. The recently formed eLIN Product Solutions Group specializes in electrification, while McLaren Engineering provides design, development, and testing services. Linamar MedTech, the company's medical solutions group, focuses on manufacturing solutions for medical devices and precision medical components. Linamar has 26,550 employees in 65 manufacturing locations, 14 R&D centres and 28 sales offices in 17 countries in North and South America, Europe and Asia, which generated sales of $6.5 billion in 2021. It is Canada's second-largest automobile parts manufacturer (after Magna International. Based in Guelph, Ontario, the company's various operations employ more than 29,000 persons worldwide in a total of 60 manufacturing plants, 8 R&D centers and 25 sales offices in 17 countries located in North and South America, Europe and Asia. Total sales in 2018 were $7.6 billion.

History
Linamar was founded in 1966 by the Hungarian refugee Ferenc (Frank) Hasenfratz who escaped from his country during the Russian crackdown precipitated by the Hungarian Revolution of 1956. He had attended technical schools in Hungary and had been employed as a toolmaker. According to Forbes, he started the small operation in his basement in 1964 in Ariss, Ontario. The company, with a staff of five, was incorporated in 1966 as Linamar Machine Limited, named after his two daughters, Linda and Nancy and his late wife Margaret. Linamar's first major contract was to manufacture automotive oil pumps for Ford.

Hasenfratz (1935–2022) was the Chairman while the current CEO is Linda Hasenfratz; the company is headquartered in Guelph, Ontario.

Linamar is a major factor in the economy of Southern Ontario, Canada. As a result, the federal government agreed to provide $50.7 million in a repayable loan to Linamar through its Automotive Innovation Fund and the province pledged up to $50.25 million in a one-time grant in January 2015. That funding, plus an internal investment of $400 million (by the company) was intended for expansion that was expected to create 1,200 jobs in Guelph, Ontario by 2025. (Over 8000 people were employed by Linamar in that city at the time.)

An early 2018 announcement indicated that the company would receive additional funding from the federal and provincial governments, up to $101 million, for expansion that would create 1500 additional jobs and maintain 8,000 others. CEO Linda Hasenfratz who is one of the members of the federal NAFTA advisory panel, told the news media that the funding would enable the expansion of its parts for conventional, hybrid, battery electric and fuel cell electric vehicles. At that time, the company employed 9,000 individuals in Canada, most in Guelph. The number of manufacturing plants in Ontario totaled, with all but one in Guelph. "We plan to continue to invest in this evolving factory of the future in many different ways with a focus on areas such as vision systems, collaborative advanced robotics, incorporating sensors into our products, and collecting that data to help us improve product design," she added. A federal government press release indicated that some of the funding would support artificial intelligence, three-dimensional printing and clean technology. The provincial government's release stated that the funding would enable the company to build next-generation transmissions and drive trains, high-efficiency engine parts and develop technologies for electric and connected vehicles and would also help create an innovation centre for R&D on artificial intelligence, machine learning, collaborative robotics and other technology. The company planned up to $500 million over the long term investing in high-tech programs such as artificial intelligence.

World presence

Canada 
The corporate office is located in Guelph, Ontario, Canada.

Guelph, Ontario 

 Autocom Mfg.
 Camcor Mfg.
 Camtac Mfg.
 Cemtol Mfg.
 Comtech Mfg.
 Corvex Mfg.
 Eston Mfg.
 Hastech Mfg Plant 1 and Plant 2
 Inovation Hub (iHub)
 Linergy Mfg. Inc.
 Linamar Gear
 Linamar Transportation Inc.
 Linamar Performance Centre (LPC)
 Linex Mfg.
 LPP Mfg.Inc.
 PowerCor Mfg.
 Quadrad Mfg.
 Roctel Mfg.
 Skyjack Inc, Plants 1 and 2
 Spinic Mfg.
 The Frank Hasenfratz Centre of Excellence in Manufacturing {The Centre}
 Transgear Mfg.
 Traxle Mfg.
 Vehcom Mfg.

Windsor, Ontario 

 Exkor Manufacturing

Winnipeg, Manitoba 

 MacDon Industries Ltd.

United States

Arizona 

 Skyjack Mfg. S.W.

Illinois

 Skyjack Product Support

Michigan

 Linamar Sales Corp.
 Linamar U.S.A. INC.
 McLaren Performance Technologies INC. (McLaren Engineering)

North Carolina

 Linamar North Carolina (Pisgah & Mitchell locations)
 Linamar Forgings Carolina, Inc. (LFC)
 Linamar Light Metals Mills River, Inc. (LLMMR)

Mexico 

 Engicom Ramos Arizpe, Coahuila
 Industrias de Linamar S.A. de C.V. Gomez Palacio, Durango
 Linamar de Mexico S.A. de C.V. Ramos Arizpe, Coahuila
 Linamar Driveline Systems Nuevo Laredo, Tamaulipas
 Montiac SA de CV, Torreon, Coahuila
 Skyjack Inc. Ramos Arizpe, Coahuila

Bulgaria 

 Montupet EOOD, Ruse, Ruse

France 

 Linamar Saint-Chamond, Saint-Chamond, Rhone-Alpes
 Linamar Montfaucon Transmission, Montfacon, Auvergne
 Montupet SA, Clichy
 Montupet SA Laigneville, Laigneville
 Montupet SA Châteauroux, Châteauroux

Germany 

 Linamar Antriebstechnik GmbH (LAT), Crimmitschau, Saxony
 Linamar Powertrain GmbH (LPT), Crimmitschau, Saxony
 Linamar Valvetrain GmbH (LVT), Thale-Warnstedt, Saxony
 Linamar Development Center GmbH (LDC), Crimmitschau, Saxony
 Seissenschmidt GmbH, Plettenberg, Nordrhein-Westfalen
 Seissenschmidt Components Processing KG, Plettenberg, Nordrhein-Westfalen
 Seissenschmidt Heat Treatment KG, Halver, Nordrhein-Westfalen
 LINAMAR SEISSENSCHMIDT Hildburghausen GmbH + Co. KG, Hildburghausen, Thuringia

Hungary 

 Linamar Products Division (LPD), Orosháza, Békés
 OROS Division (OROS), Orosháza, Békés
 Precision Parts Manufacturing (PPM), Békéscsaba, Békés
 Linamar Gyöngyös Kft Gyöngyös, Heves
 Linamar Technology Hungary (LTH), Békéscsaba, Békés

Spain 

 Aluminio y Aleaciones, S.A., Zaragoza, Aragon

United Kingdom 

 Montupet UK Ltd., Dunmurry, Northern Ireland
 Skyjack UK Ltd., Oswestry, England

China 

 Linamar Automotive Systems (WUXI) Co. Ltd., Wuxi, Jiangsu
 Linamar Automotive Systems (WUXI 2), Wuxi, Jiangsu
 Linamar Tianjin Co. Ltd. (LTJ), Tianjin, Tianjin
 Linamar Asia-Pacific Group (China) Sales Office, Shanghai, Shanghai

India 

 Linamar India Private Ltd (LIP), Pune, Maharashtra
 Jaya Hind Montupet Private Ltd, Pune, Maharashtra
 Jaya Hind Montupet Private Ltd, Dewas, Madhya Pradesh

Japan 

 Linamar Japan Sales Office, Tokyo

South Korea 

 Linamar Automotive Systems Korea Ltd., Ansan-City, Kyunggi

References 

Companies listed on the Toronto Stock Exchange
Auto parts suppliers of Canada
Canadian companies established in 1966